Galium hypotrichium is a species of flowering plant in the coffee family known by the common name alpine bedstraw. It is native to the western United States, where it grows in mountain and plateau habitats, including parts of the Great Basin and Sierra Nevada in California, Nevada, and Utah.

Galium hypotrichium is a perennial herb forming mats from woody bases, sometimes taking dwarf form with stems just a few centimeters long. The stems have many whorls of four fleshy rounded or oval leaves. The inflorescences are made up of small protruding clusters of flowers scattered along the stems. The flowers may be white or tinged with yellow, green, pink, or red. It is dioecious, with male and female flowers on separate plants.

Subspecies
Six subspecies are currently recognized (May 2014):

Galium hypotrichium subsp. ebbettsense Dempster & Ehrend - Alpine County CA
Galium hypotrichium subsp. hypotrichium - California and Nevada
Galium hypotrichium subsp. inyoense Dempster & Ehrend - Inyo County CA
Galium hypotrichium subsp. nevadense Dempster & Ehrend - Nevada and Utah
Galium hypotrichium subsp. subalpinum (Hilend & J.T.Howell) Ehrend. - southern California
Galium hypotrichium subsp. tomentellum Ehrend. - Panamint Ridge in Inyo County CA

References

External links
USDA Plants Profile for Galium hypotrichium
UC CalPhotos gallery of Galium hypotrichium

hypotrichium
Flora of California
Flora of Nevada
Flora of Utah
Flora of the Great Basin
Flora of the Sierra Nevada (United States)
Endemic flora of the United States
Natural history of the Mojave Desert
Plants described in 1865
Taxa named by Asa Gray
Dioecious plants
Flora without expected TNC conservation status